Beast is the fifth studio album by American heavy metal band DevilDriver. It was released on February 22, 2011 in the United States. It is also their last album to feature longtime bassist Jon Miller who left in 2011 but would return to the band a decade later in 2022.

Beast sold an over 11,000 copies in the United States in its first week of release to debut at number 42 on the Billboard 200 chart.

Recording and production
Beast was recorded at Sonic Ranch studios in Tornillo, Texas; and was produced by Mark Lewis.

"The record is extreme," vocalist Dez Fafara told Revolver magazine. "And it attacks from start to finish. If you liked [2007's] The Last Kind Words, this is like that on steroids and crank, driving a Buick Skylark 200 miles an hour straight to Vegas." "I felt like I was waking up and experiencing a moment of clarity that brought out all these pissed off, negative emotions," Fafara said of making the album. "It's an all-out release of pain. "It's been a beast of a year and a half, and it's still going," he added. Regarding the new album's musical direction, drummer John Boecklin stated, "It's interesting to me — it's not the fastest shit we have done, nor the slowest, [but it] just [has] lots of groove. But to me, when people say 'it's got groove,' I think it's a nice way of saying simple and boring these days. We wanted to avoid this. "Our record has a great contrast of dark riffs, stomp bouncing drums with the right amount of blasts and double bass, and outstanding vocal delivery from Dez that takes it past your average approach of the metal attempt. I'm not talking about reinventing the wheel or nothing. I just think our new album sits in its own corner from any of our other albums." 

The band recorded 14 songs during the Beast sessions, with 12 tracks making the standard version of the CD and all 14 songs appearing on the special edition.

The special edition also includes the band's documentary You May Know Us from the Stage and official music videos spanning DevilDriver's career thus far.

Promotion and release
The first single, "Dead to Rights", was released on January 10, 2011. The online Beast E-Team created by Daniel Wells and Sean Smith was mostly responsible for crashing Roadrunner Records systems on January 10, 2011, when "Dead to Rights" was released for download.

A second track, "Coldblooded" was posted on January 28.

On January 31, a new track "Bring the Fight (To the Floor)" was posted though Revolver magazine as a "Revolver Bootleg series". Revolver also interviewed frontman Dez Fafara about the song:

French site jeuxactu.com got the exclusive for "Talons Out (Teeth Sharpened)", another track from the album, on February 4.

The metal-specialized site MetalSucks got an exclusive to the music video of the first single "Dead to Rights" on February 9, the first music video from the album.

Another song, "You Make Me Sick", was made available for streaming February 14 via Blabbermouth.net. This song was featured in an episode of the US version of Shameless.

"Alt Press" got an exclusive stream of the track "Blur" on February 16. Dez Fafara said about the song:

The whole album was made available for streaming via DevilDriver's official MySpace on February 18, four days before the album's release.

Track listing

CD credits 
Writing, performance and production credits are adapted from the album liner notes.

Personnel 
DevilDriver
 Dez Fafara – vocals
 Mike Spreitzer – lead guitar, bass
 Jeff Kendrick – rhythm guitar, bass
 Jon Miller – bass, additional guitars
 John Boecklin – drums, additional guitars, bass

Production
 Mark Lewis – production, engineering
 Charles Godfrey – assistant engineer, drum tech
 Juan Sebastian – additional assisting
 Daniel Castleman – vocal recording assistant
 Mike Spreitzer – music pre-production, additional recording
 Greg Weiss – vocal pre-production, additional recording
 Andy Sneap – mixing, mastering

Artwork and design
 Dez Fafara – art direction
 Ryan Clark – design
 Travis Shinn – photography

Studios 
 Sonic Ranch, Tornillo, Texas – music recording
 Lambesis Studios, Del Mar, California – vocal recording
 Ocean242 Studios – music pre-production, additional recording
 Backstage Recording Studios, Derbyshire, UK – mixing, mastering

Venues 
 Mr. Smalls, Midvale, PA – live recording of "Grinfucked" on October 13, 2005

DVD credits 
You may Know Us from the Stage
 Daniel J. Burke – directing, editing, filming

"Not all Who Wander Are Lost"
 Nathan Cox – directing
 Lynn Kramer – production

"Clouds Over California"
 Nathan Cox – directing
 Brian Robinson – production

"Pray for Villains"
 Nathan Cox – directing
 Ken Franchi – production

"Fate Stepped In", "Another Night in London"
 Daniel J. Burke – directing, production

Charts

References

External links 
 
 Beast at DevilDriver's official website
 Beast at Roadrunner Records
 Beast (Special Edition) at Roadrunner Records

2011 albums
Albums produced by Mark Lewis (music producer)
DevilDriver albums
Roadrunner Records albums
Albums recorded at Sonic Ranch